Viva Emptiness is the sixth album by Katatonia, released in 2003 by Peaceville Records. On the album's tenth anniversary in 2013, it was re-released, featuring a new mix, mastering and additional keyboard arrangements.

Background 
The album marked the first time that the band chose to self-produce their next record, which Jonas Renkse later described as a "weird decision" and said that the experience was "a little bit difficult."

Musical style 
Its main subjects are loneliness, social relations, crime, lying and depression. According to AllMusic, Viva Emptiness incorporates a mix of "dark gothic pop, crushing heavy rock, textured keyboards, lithe pop melodies, beautifully crafted songs with unique dynamics and sculpted sonic environments to surround them, and bleak, even morose subject matter."

Release 
Viva Emptiness was released on 29 April 2003. The album was re-released in 2013. The re-release features new keyboard arrangements and was completely remixed and remastered by David Castillo, as the band wasn't satisfied with the overall sound and production of the original release. In an interview concerning the album's 10th anniversary re-release, Renkse also said that the drum mix "wasn’t good at all," citing the snare sound in particular as being "just horrible," and thus the drum mix was modified in the re-release. The track "Inside the City of Glass" features vocals and lyrics on this edition, compared to the instrumental version included in the original release. The song "Wait Outside" was also included as a bonus track, originally recorded during the album sessions, but was not released until 2005 on The Black Sessions.

Track listing

Personnel 
Band
 Jonas Renkse – vocals, guitar, programming
 Anders Nyström – guitar, keyboards, programming
 Fredrik Norrman – guitar
 Mattias Norrman – bass, slide guitar on "One Year from Now"
 Daniel Liljekvist – drums, percussion, backing vocals on "Ghost of the Sun"

Production
Travis Smith – art direction, design
Dan Swanö – additional editing
Jens Bogren – mixing
 Peter In De Betou – mastering

Charts

References 

Katatonia albums
2003 albums
Albums with cover art by Travis Smith (artist)